The Military ranks of Mali are the military insignia used by the Malian Armed Forces. Mali is a landlocked country, and does therefore not possess a navy. Being a former colony of France, Mali shares a rank structure similar to that of France.

Commissioned officer ranks 
The rank insignia of commissioned officers.

Other ranks 
The rank insignia of non-commissioned officers and enlisted personnel.

References

External links
 
 

Mali
Military of Mali